State Highway 13 (SH-13) is a state highway located entirely within Idaho County in North Central Idaho. In addition to those cities, SH-13 also serves the city of Stites and the community of Harpster. SH-13 has one special route, Business Loop 13 in Kooskia.

Route description
SH-13 begins at an intersection with US-95 in western Grangeville.  It heads east through that city along Main Street.  East of Grangeville, the highway heads generally northeast along the Harpster Grade Road, through the rolling farmland of Idaho County.   east of Grangeville, the terrain becomes mountainous as SH-13 begins a descent towards the South Fork Clearwater River.  At the bottom of the  descent is an intersection with SH-14 at the western banks of the river.

 north of its intersection with SH-14, SH-13 crosses the South Fork Clearwater River and continues along the eastern banks.  For the rest of its routing, SH-13 runs parallel to the river; a significant portion of which is within sight of the river.  Since it lies at the bottom of the river valley, the road way is relatively flat, but it is surrounded by rugged, tree-lined hills.  The highway passes through the communities of Harpster and Stites on its way towards Kooskia.

As it approaches Kooskia, the river valley widens allowing some space between the river and highway. It passes the city's municipal airport at the southern city limits. Now in the city, the road goes through its business district. At Broadway, SH-13's only child route, State Highway 13 Business (SH-13 Bus.), turns off to the east. Shortly thereafter, the mainline SH-13 crosses the Middle Fork Clearwater River near the confluence of the south and middle forks. At the other side of the bridge, SH-13 ends at US 12.

Major intersections

Related route

SH-13 Business is an alternate connection between SH-13 and US-12 in Kooskia. It begins at an intersection with SH-13 in the northern half of the city and runs east along Broadway. It turns to the southeast before crossing the Middle Fork Clearwater River and ending at US-12.

See also

 List of state highways in Idaho
 List of highways numbered 13

References

External links

013
Transportation in Idaho County, Idaho